Argomuellera is a genus of plant of the family Euphorbiaceae first described as a genus in 1894. It is native to sub-Saharan Africa, Madagascar, and the Comoros Islands.

Species

Formerly included
moved to Droceloncia or Pycnocoma 
 Argomuellera reticulata - Pycnocoma reticulata 
 Argomuellera rigidifolia - Droceloncia rigidifolia

Notes

References

Pycnocomeae
Euphorbiaceae genera